Sihanouk Hospital Center of HOPE (SHCH) is a free non-governmental hospital in Phnom Penh, Cambodia, which is helping to rebuild the country's medical infrastructure by treating patients and training medical personnel. It is named for King Norodam Sihanouk.

History

An estimated 2 million people had died in the Cambodian genocide, and in 1979 only 49 doctors remained alive in the country. Between 1994–1996, three international nonprofit organizations worked to establish a free hospital in Cambodia: Japan Relief for Cambodia (founded by Bernard Krisher), WorldMate, and HOPE worldwide. Volunteers from HOPE worldwide such as internist Cameron Gifford and nurse Cathy Pingoy initially provided its staffing. The hospital was named in honor of Cambodia's "King Father", Norodam Sihanouk.

In March 1997, when the country had no inpatient facilities for those with mental illness, the hospital had provided services to 2,000 such patients and had administered 13,000 consultations.

Construction of a $300,000 annex to the hospital's main building began in January 2002 to expand its community AIDS program, and treatments of diabetes, dermatology, and hypertension. At the time, the hospital had instituted a lottery system as demand for its services outpaced the hospital's ability to provide care.

In August, 2008, SHCH's emergency room was receiving 400 patients each day and operated as the only free hospital in the country. In 2009, the hospital was serving 3,000 AIDS HIV-positive patients. 

Carol A. Rodley, the U.S. ambassador to Cambodia, said in 2009 that, "Not only is this one of the busiest adult hospitals in Cambodia, it is one of the best. The hardworking staff here provides the poor with health care of the highest standard at no charge".

After 20 years in operation, SHCH had provided training courses to 5,000 healthcare professionals and treated 1.3 million patients. In 2016, its operating budget was $4.5 million dollars. Gary Jacques, the hospital's director from 2003–2007, noted that when he started, most key staff members were expatriates, but now Cambodians had been trained to fill those roles, and the number of women in directorial positions had grown.

Operations
According to its website, the hospital's mission is "To provide affordable, quality healthcare to those living in Cambodia in poverty, while training the nation's top clinicians to further serve the Cambodian population." Payment for medical services is based on the patient's ability to pay, using a sliding scale. 

In 2017, an SHCH spokesperson told The Phnom Penh Post that over 60% of its patients were from rural areas, with more than two-thirds living on less than $5 per day.  

In November 2022, SHCH was administering training programs to over 500 health professionals annually, and was recognized by Cambodia's Ministry of Health (MoH) as a training and research institution. With over 200 Cambodians on staff, the hospital's laboratory, nursing, pharmacy, radiology, and surgical departments are the main training sites for Cambodia's university medical students.

References

External links

Sihanouk Hospital Center of HOPE website

Hospitals in Cambodia